Robert John Parsons (c. 1802 – June 20, 1883) was a journalist and politician in Newfoundland. He represented St. John's East in the Newfoundland and Labrador House of Assembly from 1843 to 1874.

He was born in Harbour Grace. Parsons apprenticed as a printer with the Royal Gazette in St. John's and was foreman in Henry David Winton's printing office for six years. He became managing editor for the Newfoundland Patriot, becoming owner and editor in 1840. In 1835, he married Eliza Flood. Parsons died in St. John's in 1883.

His son Robert John Parsons, Jr. also served in the Newfoundland assembly.

References
 

Members of the Newfoundland and Labrador House of Assembly
1883 deaths
Year of birth uncertain
Newfoundland Colony people